Fotbal Club FCSB, commonly known as FCSB, is a Romanian professional football club based in Bucharest. It has spent its entire history in the top flight of the Romanian league system, the Liga I.

The original Steaua București football team was founded in 1947 and belonged to the Ministry of National Defence, through the namesake CSA Steaua București sports club. In 1998, the football department and its facilities were separated from the latter and taken over by a group of shareholders in a post-Ceaușescu privatisation scheme, allegedly leading to one of the shareholders acquiring full ownership five years later. However, CSA Steaua București has been in conflict with the football club since 2011, claiming that it was a new and separate entity; this resulted in multiple court cases and the forced change of the name from
FC Steaua București to  FC FCSB in early 2017.

Domestically, when taken together with the disputed pre-2003 honours, the club has won the Liga I 26 times, Cupa României 24 times, Cupa Ligii two times, and Supercupa României six times—all competition records. Internationally, they have won the European Cup and European Super Cup, both in 1986. They reached the European Cup final once again in 1989, when they were defeated by AC Milan. Throughout their history, the Roș-albaștrii also played the final of the Intercontinental Cup, the quarter-finals of the European Cup Winners' Cup and the semi-finals of the UEFA Cup.

FCSB's home ground is Arena Națională, having moved here from the Ministry of National Defence-owned Stadionul Ghencea. Initially, the club played in the colours of the Romanian tricolour, but the team became associated with the red and blue scheme after yellow soon lost its importance. Recently, some kits have begun reintegrating the latter colour.

The club has a long-standing rivalry with neighbouring Dinamo București, with matches between the two being commonly referred to as the "Eternal Derby" or the "Romanian Derby".

History

ASA București (Asociația Sportivă a Armatei București – "Army Sports Association") was founded on 7 June 1947 at the initiative of several officers of the Romanian Royal House. The establishment took place following a decree signed by General Mihail Lascăr, High Commander of the Romanian Royal Army. It was formed as a sports society with seven initial sections, including football, coached by Coloman Braun-Bogdan. ASA was renamed CSCA (Clubul Sportiv Central al Armatei – "Central Sports Club of the Army") in 1948 and CCA (Casa Centrală a Armatei – "Central House of the Army") in 1950.

In 1949, CSCA won its first trophy, the Cupa României, defeating CSU Cluj 2–1 in the final. Under the name of CCA, the club managed to win three Championship titles in a row in 1951, 1952 and 1953, along with its first Championship–Cup double in 1951. During the 1950s, the so-called "CCA Golden Team" became nationally famous. In 1956, the Romania national team (composed exclusively of CCA players) played Yugoslavia in Belgrade and won 1–0. In the same year, CCA, coached by Ilie Savu, became the first Romanian team to participate in a tournament in England, where it achieved noteworthy results against the likes of Luton Town, Arsenal, Sheffield Wednesday and Wolverhampton Wanderers.

At the end of 1961, CCA changed its name once again to CSA Steaua București (Clubul Sportiv al Armatei Steaua – "Army Sports Club Steaua"). The club's new name translated to The Star and was adopted because of the presence of a red star, a symbol of most East European Army clubs, on its crest. A poor period of almost two decades followed in which the club claimed only three championships (1967–68, 1975–76, 1977–78). Instead, the team won nine national cup trophies, for which matter it gained the nickname of "cup specialists". Also during this period, on 9 April 1974 Steaua's ground, Stadionul Ghencea, was inaugurated with a friendly match against OFK Belgrade.

Under the leadership of coaches Emerich Jenei and Anghel Iordănescu, Steaua had an impressive Championship run in the 1984–85 season, which it won after a six-year break. Subsequently, Steaua became the first Romanian club to reach a European Cup final, which it ultimately won against Barcelona on penalties (2–0 thanks to goalkeeper Helmuth Duckadam saving all four penalties taken by the Spaniards), after a goalless draw. Steaua therefore became the first Eastern European team to claim the title of European champions. An additional European Super Cup was won in 1987 against Dynamo Kyiv. Steaua remained at the top of European football for the rest of the decade, managing one more European Cup semi-final in 1987–88 and one more European Cup final in 1989 (lost 4–0 to Milan). Notably, this was in addition to its four additional national titles (1985–86, 1986–87, 1987–88, 1988–89) and four national cups (1984–85, 1986–87, 1987–88, 1988–89). Furthermore, from June 1986 to September 1989, Steaua ran a record 104-match undefeated streak in the championship, setting a world record for that time and a European one still standing.

The Romanian Revolution led the country towards a free open market and, subsequently, several players of the 1980s team left for other clubs in the West. After a short pull-back, a quick recovery followed and Steaua managed a six consecutive championship streak between 1992–93 and 1997–98 to equalize the 1920s performance of Chinezul Timișoara and also three more cups in 1995–96, 1996–97 and 1998–99. At an international level, the club also managed to reach the UEFA Champions League group stage three years in a row between 1994–95 and 1996–97.
In 1998, the football club separated from CSA Steaua and changed its name to FC Steaua București, being led by Romanian businessman Viorel Păunescu. Păunescu performed poorly as a president and soon the club was plunged into debt. George Becali, another businessman, was offered the position of vice-president in the hope that Becali would invest money in the club. In 2003, Becali allegedly managed to gain control over the club by turning it from non-profit to a public share company.

Because of his controversial character, he has been challenged by the majority of Steaua fans. The team qualified for the UEFA Cup group stage in the 2004–05 season and became the first Romanian team to make it to the European football spring since 1993 (also Steaua's performance). The next season, Steaua reached the UEFA Cup semi-finals in 2005–06, where it was eliminated by Middlesbrough thanks to a last-minute goal. Steaua thereafter qualified for the following Champions League seasons after a ten-year break, and in 2007–08 Steaua again reached the group stage of the Champions League. Nationally, the club won two titles—in 2004–05 and 2005–06—and the Supercupa României in 2006, the latter being the club's 50th trophy in its 59-year history.

In 2013, Steaua won its 24th national title, and also subsequently reached the 2013–14 UEFA Champions League group stage. It repeated the former performance in each of the next two years, being awarded the championship in 2014 and 2015.

After the Ministry of National Defense sued the club, claiming that the Romanian Army were the rightful owners of the Steaua logo, colours, honours and name, the Executive Committee of the Romanian Football Federation approved an application to modify the name of the club from "FC Steaua București" to "FC FCSB" on 30 March 2017, following more judiciary sentences. CSA Steaua București had previously announced they would refound their football department in the summer of the same year. However, owner Becali announced that his team would retain the original honours and UEFA coefficient, and was also hopeful of recovering the name in the near future.

Between 2016 and 2019, FCSB finished each time as runners-up in the league, thus becoming the first club in Romania to do so for four consecutive years. On 5 July 2019, yet another unfavorable ruling was handed out against the team. According to it, CSA Steaua would be the rightful entity to assert the honors up until 2003, however, the decision is not definitive.

Crest and colours 

During its first season, 1947–48, Steaua wore yellow and red striped shirts with blue shorts, to symbolize Romania's tricolor flag. Starting with the following season and with the Army's change of identity from the Royal Army to the People's Army, the yellow was gradually given up, so that the official colors remained, up to this day, the red and the blue.

As communists assumed total control of the country on 30 December 1947, the Royal Army was transformed into the People's Army and ASA automatically with it. Being inspired by the Red Army, the new Ministry of Defence decided to create a crest for the club, along with the change of name to CSCA, consisting in an A-labeled red star (symbol of the Red Army) on a blue disc.

Two years later, the change of name to CCA brought with it a new crest consisting of the same red star labeled CCA surrounded by a crown of laurel. The all-present star motif on the crest finally had its saying over the new name of Steaua as up 1961. It was opted for a badge which, redesigned, remains up to this day the club's symbol: the red and blue striped background with a golden star in the middle, to symbolize to Romanian tricolour flag. The shape for the emblem was redesigned in 1974, once the team moved to Stadionul Ghencea.

Following the Romanian Revolution, the Army decided to break all links to the defunct communist regime, so, in 1991, CSA Steaua had a last change of crest with an eagle also present on the Ministry of Defence coat of arms and also on Romania's. As FC Steaua appeared in 1998, the club added two yellow stars on top of the CSA Steaua badge signifying its 20 titles of champions won, along with the Fotbal Club specification.

In 2003, the new Board of Administration run by George Becali decided to change the crest, which was a return to the old emblem of 1974–1991, redesigned with the two yellow stars on top. The club started to use acronym of the name FCSB before the official change of the name in 2017.

Steaua has never had a standard playing kit. However, the most widely used throughout time was the combination of red shirts, blue shorts and red socks. Other variants have been all-red, all-blue and also shirts in vertical red and blue stripes during the 1960s and 1970s. Other kit colours have very rarely been used. Exceptions were the 1986 European Cup Final in which Steaua wore, for the only time in their history, an all-white kit, the 1999–00 away kit (yellow and red), the 2005–06 third kit (yellow and black), the 2008–2010 away kit (a shade of neon yellow-green), the 2010–12 and 2014–16 away kit (all-yellow), the 2012–14 away kit ( all-sky blue or sky blue shirts with dark navy blue shorts and socks). For the 2016–17 and 2017–18 seasons, the away kit was all-white. For the 2018–19 and 2019–20 seasons the away kit was ice blue with a darker shade on sleeves. For the 2020–21 and 2021–22 seasons, the kit is all-white again.

The Ministry of National Defense sued Steaua in 2011, claiming that the Romanian Army were the rightful owners of the Steaua logo, among others. The Supreme Court found in the army's favour, and on 3 December 2014 stripped the football club of its badge. Steaua were forced to play their next home game, against CSM Studențesc Iași, without it on the stadium scoreboard. A new badge was unveiled in January 2015, an eight-sided star containing the letters "FCSB", which would eventually become the official name of the club in 2017.

Kit manufacturers and shirt sponsors 
Its kit is manufactured by Nike, who have held the contract since 2002, after a long partnership with Adidas. First team shirt sponsors have been betting company Betano since 2022. Previous sponsors include Ford, Castrol, Philips, CBS, Bancorex (initially BRCE), Dialog (currently Orange), BCR, RAFO, CitiFinancial and City Insurance..

Stadium 

Steaua played the first three matches in its history at the defunct Venus stadium. Opened in 1931, the venue had previously been in the property of Venus București, a club disbanded in 1949. After that ground's demolition through order of the Communist regime, Steaua played its home matches at any one of Bucharest's three largest multi-use stadia: ANEF, Republicii (built in 1926 and demolished in 1984 to make room for the erection of the Casa Poporului) and 23 August (built in 1953). Of these two, 23 August (later renamed Național) was mostly used when two matches between Bucharest clubs were scheduled in the same matchday or for important European matches, while Republicii for regular matches in the championship.

From 1974 to 2015, Steaua played its home matches at the Stadionul Ghencea, a football stadium situated in South-Western Bucharest. Part of Complexul Sportiv Steaua, it was inaugurated on 9 April 1974 when Steaua played a friendly match against OFK Beograd, at which time it was the first football-only stadium ever built in Communist Romania, with no track & field facilities. The stadium was built through order of the Ministry of National Defence inside a former military base and was long used by CSA Steaua.

The original capacity was 30,000 on benches. A general renovation occurred in 1991; this included installing seats, which dropped the capacity to 28,365. After a second renovation in 2006, Ghencea was able to host UEFA Champions League events, being a  'Category 3' arena according to the UEFA classification system.

The Romania national team was also a tenant for numerous fixtures.

From 2011, Steaua played European games and its most important domestic games at the newly constructed Arena Națională, and from March 2015, played exclusively at the Arena Națională.

Support

Steaua has the largest number of supporters of any team in Romania. A survey conducted in June 2007 suggested that the club accounts for approximately 42% of all Romanian football lovers, far greater than the teams ranked second and third, Dinamo București, with 12%, and Rapid București, with 9%.

The largest concentration of fans are in Bucharest, notably in areas adjacent to the arena, covering the whole southern half of Bucharest, a city geographically divided by the Dâmbovița River. Also, the club has an important fan base inside the country, where several towns are renowned for counting vast majorities of Steaua supporters, and outside the borders, among Romanian emigrants.

The Steaua Ultras movement began in 1995, when the bases of Armata Ultra (AU), the first Ultras group from Bucharest (and second in Romania after Politehnica Timișoara's Commando Viola Ultra Curva Sud), were set. The group quickly reached an impressive number of members, but, in 2001, they dissolved due to internal problems. Steaua's supporters then divided into several groups, some of them being located at the Peluza Nord ("North End" – Titan Boys, Nucleo, Insurgenții 1998, Skins 1996, Combat, Tornado 47, Armata 47 Vest), while some other ones taking their place at the Peluza Sud ("South End" – Vacarm, Glas, E.R.A., Hunters, Outlaws, Shadows, Roosters, T.K., Tinerii Sudiști). Several important groups such as Stil Ostil, Ultras, Banda Ultra and South Boys retired from attending Steaua's matches due to the club's constant abuses towards them and, mainly, to the current ownership of Steaua.

More recently, as of 2006, the supporters have formed their own official association, called AISS (Asociația Independentă a Suporterilor Steliști – "Steaua Supporters' Independent Association"). AISS was formed as a legal entity with its stated goals of "protecting the interests and image of Steaua supporters", as well as "identifying and promoting the club's perennial values".

Steaua's Peluza Nord and Peluza Sud fan groups no longer support the current team, as a sign of protest. The Peluza Sud have instead started to attend the matches of CSA Steaua. However, an online poll conducted by Sport.ro in 2017 has shown that of the 120,000 voters, 95% consider FCSB to hold the real Steaua identity.

Rivalries

Steaua's most important rivalry is the one against Dinamo București. Eternul derby ("The Eternal Derby") has been the leading Romanian football encounter since 1948, as Steaua and Dinamo are the two most successful football teams in the country. There have been more than 150 matches played so far between Steaua and Dinamo in the Romanian League, the Romanian Cup and also the Romanian Supercup. With 44 titles combined (Steaua – 26; Dinamo – 18), the two sides have won 36 more than the third-most successful Liga I club, Venus București. It is also a match between the former clubs of the Romanian Army (Steaua) and the Ministry of Internal Affairs (Dinamo). Several clashes between different factions of supporters have often occurred and still occur inside and outside the stadium. The heyday was reached before a match kick-off in 1997, when Dinamo's fans set a sector of Stadionul Ghencea's Peluza Sud, where they were assigned, on fire. On 16 August 2016, during Steaua's Champions League play-off 0–5 loss to Manchester City, undercover Dinamo fans displayed a huge message saying Doar Dinamo București ("Only Dinamo Bucharest"), which was labelled one of the biggest pranks in football history. Between October 1991 and April 2000, Steaua counted 19 undefeated official matches in front of their rivals, both in the championship and the cup. Just as well, a period of 17 years and 7 months has been recorded in which Dinamo did not manage to win away against Steaua in the domestic league.

The second-most important rivalry was with Rapid București, often called Bucharest derby. Several matches throughout the years between Steaua and Rapid have also ended in serious clashes between fans. The conflict has become even fiercer after Steaua outpassed Rapid in an all-Romanian quarter-final of the 2005–06 UEFA Cup. The local sports newspapers said that the two teams were linked up in this quarter-final by the line of the number 41 tram which links the Ghencea Stadium to the Valentin Stănescu Stadium.

Milder and historical rivalries are also with non-Bucharest-based teams, such as CFR Cluj, Universitatea Craiova, Politehnica Timișoara, Petrolul Ploiești, Universitatea Cluj and a recent one with Astra Giurgiu.

 Friendships 
As Steaua is the most popular club in Romania, there are, besides Bucharest, several cities counting a great majority of red and blue supporters among football lovers. Widely speaking, these cities are predominant in the Eastern half of the country, particularly in the regions of Moldavia, Greater Wallachia and Northern Dobruja. Cities such as Suceava, Piatra Neamț, Bacău, Galați (inside Moldavia), Constanța (Northern Dobruja), Buzău, Brăila, Târgoviște, Călărași (Greater Wallachia), Râmnicu Vâlcea, Târgu Jiu (Oltenia), Brașov, Oradea, Sibiu, Târgu Mureș or Petroșani (Transylvania) enjoy a great majority of Steaua fans which are often well-received even by fans of the local teams.

The club is also popular outside the borders, notably between Romanian emigrants. The Valencian Community in Spain accounts for an important number of supporters, being the most important area for this matter.

Steaua fans are also maintaining good relations with the fans of CSKA Sofia of Bulgaria, with whom they share the common root of once representing the teams of their national armies. Some ultras are also friends with the ultras from UTA Arad, Corvinul Hunedoara and Farul Constanța.

Ownership and finances
Steaua has previously been known as the club of the Romanian Army, which founded it in 1947 as a sports society. The Army continues to own the sports society, named CSA Steaua București. The football department, however, separated and turned private in 1998, owned and financed by a non-profit organization called AFC Steaua București, chaired by businessman Viorel Păunescu.

In January 2003, the team allegedly turned public under the leadership of investor and former politician George Becali, who had already purchased 51% of the society's shares and later on acquired the rest to become the owner of the club. At present, Becali has no official links with FCSB, as he gradually renounced his shares. However, the facts that the current shareholders, that include several nephews of his, are people loyal to him and that he is still in charge of FCSB are obvious. An unofficial explanation for this situation is represented by the heavy amount of unpaid taxes added up by the former governing company, AFC Steaua București, whose payment towards the tax authority was avoided this way by transferring its assets to the new-formed company, with the old association going on liquidation bankruptcy.

George "Gigi" Becali is a highly controversial figure at FCSB, whose involvement in the life of the club and the team has often been described as authoritarian and dictatorial by both the media and the fans.

 Popular culture 
As Steaua is currently the most popular football team in Romania, a good number of musicians or TV and film directors have inspired themselves from ideas linked to the Ghencea-based club. Popular reference, however, appeared only after the Romanian Revolution, as before, mass-media programmes were mostly being controlled by the former communist regime. The 2002 Romanian film Furia depicts scenes in which Steaua and Dinamo gangs of supporters are fighting on the streets after a direct match between the two sides. Prima TV comedy show Mondenii often airs sketches parodying Steaua owner George Becali, the players and other representatives around the club. Pro TV series La bloc aired an episode in which characters Nelu and Costel are displayed as representing Steaua in a parking lot match against two other neighbours representing Dinamo.

Several other examples from music can be attributed as Steaua-related. Apart from club anthems played throughout time by Marcel Pavel, Bere Gratis, Gaz pe Foc, an album was released in 2006 as a compilation by Mircea Vintilă, Chicanos, Bogdan Dima and several other artists. Delikt and Ultras are two former hip hop bands whose members ranked the defunct Armata Ultra' brigade and would always show up displaying fan materials. Also, Voltaj, in their song 'MSD2', make reference to the fans in the line "Poți să fii câine sau poți fi stelist" ("You can be a dog or you can be a Steaua fan").

One of the most famous pop-culture references about the club is the association with Scooter's song Maria, first sung spontaneously in 2003 by the fans in Peluza Nord after the team would score. Ever since, it has been adopted as an unofficial club anthem and is being played at the stadium at every match, sung together by the supporters. Nonetheless, the song is beginning to lose popularity, mainly because it has become too commercial and many fans do not feel bonded with it any more.

Honours

Domestic

LeaguesLiga I / Divizia AWinners (26) – Record: 1951, 1952, 1953, 1956, 1959–60, 1960–61, 1967–68, 1975–76, 1977–78, 1984–85, 1985–86, 1986–87, 1987–88, 1988–89, 1992–93, 1993–94, 1994–95, 1995–96, 1996–97, 1997–98, 2000–01, 2004–05, 2005–06, 2012–13, 2013–14, 2014–15
Runners-up (19): 1954, 1957–58, 1962–63, 1976–77, 1979–80, 1983–84, 1989–90, 1990–91, 1991–92, 2002–03, 2003–04, 2006–07, 2007–08, 2015–16, 2016–17, 2017–18, 2018–19, 2020–21, 2021–22

CupsCupa RomânieiWinners (24) – Record: 1948–49, 1950, 1951, 1952, 1955, 1961–62, 1965–66, 1966–67, 1968–69, 1969–70, 1970–71, 1975–76, 1978–79, 1984–85, 1986–87, 1987–88, 1988–89, 1991–92, 1995–96, 1996–97, 1998–99, 2010–11, 2014–15, 2019–20
Runners-up (8): 1953, 1963–64, 1976–77, 1979–80, 1983–84, 1985–86, 1989–90, 2013–14Cupa LigiiWinners (2) – Record: 2014–15, 2015–16Supercupa RomânieiWinners (6) – Record: 1994, 1995, 1998, 2001, 2006, 2013
Runners-up (6): 1999, 2005, 2011, 2014, 2015, 2020

InternationalEuropean CupWinners: 1985–86
Runners-up: 1988–89European Super CupWinners: 1986Intercontinental Cup'''
Runners-up: 1986

 Rankings 

These are the International Federation of Football History & Statistics (IFFHS) club's points as of 31 October 2022:

This is the UEFA club's coefficient as of 7 November 2022:

Players

First-team squad

 Out on loan 

Notable players throughout history

 Club officials 

 Board of directors 

 
 

 Current technical staff 

 
 

 Statistics and records 

Steaua currently boasts itself with the most impressive pedigree in Romania. With 72 seasons spent in Liga I, they are one of only two teams to have played only in the first national league, along with Dinamo București (71 seasons). At the same time, the club is the current record holder for the number of national championships (26), national cups (24), national super cups (6) and the national league cup (2). Between 1993 and 1998, its run of six consecutive national titles won equaled the one of Chinezul Timișoara from the 1920s. Internationally, it is the only Romanian club to have won continental trophies (the European Champions Cup in 1986 and the European Super Cup in 1986) and to have played in the final of the European Cup (in 1986 and 1989).

For three years and three months (June 1986 – September 1989), Steaua counted a number of 104 unbeaten matches in the league, establishing, at that moment, a world record and a European one still standing. Also inside the national league, the club counted 112 matches between November 1989 and August 1996 of invincibility at Stadionul Ghencea in Liga I. Its run of 17-straight wins in 1988 is another record, equal to the one held by Dinamo as of one year later.

Tudorel Stoica is the player with the most appearances for Steaua in Liga I, a record unlikely to be broken in the nearby future, as none of the current players have entered the top-ten so far. The club's all-time top scorer in the league is Anghel Iordănescu with 146 goals, a record that also looks solid, out of the same reason as above-mentioned. Other records are currently owned by former players such as Dorinel Munteanu (most national caps – 134) or Gheorghe Hagi (most goals scored for Romania – 35; most appearances of a Romanian player in the European cups – 93).

 European cups all-time statistics 

 Notable coaches 

The following coaches have all won at least one major trophy with Steaua București:Table correct as of 31 August 2020''

Notes:
Caretaker coach.

References

External links 

FCSB at UEFA

FCSB
FCSB
 
Liga I clubs
Military association football clubs in Romania
Football clubs in Bucharest
1947 establishments in Romania
Unrelegated association football clubs
Steaua
Steaua